Marc Steven Bell (born July 15, 1952) is an American drummer. He began playing in hard rock bands in the New York City area, notably Dust and Estus. He was asked to drum for punk rock band Richard Hell and the Voidoids. He replaced drummer Tommy Ramone in the Ramones in 1978, and went by the stage name Marky Ramone from then on. He has also played drums for other punk rock and heavy metal bands, including his own band Marky Ramone and the Intruders. He continues to keep the Ramones legacy alive around the world with his band Marky Ramone's Blitzkrieg.

Ramone lives in Brooklyn Heights with his wife, Marion Flynn. In 2015, he released his autobiography Punk Rock Blitzkrieg: My Life as a Ramone.

Early life 
According to his autobiography, he and his twin brother Fred were born at New York Infirmary for Indigent Women and Children on July 15, 1952, and is of Dutch ancestry on his father's side and of French and German ancestry on his mother's side.

Music career 

Bell began playing drums in 1971 with the hard rock band Dust, featuring Kenny Aaronson on bass and Richie Wise on guitar, and produced by Kenny Kerner. Bell recorded two albums with the band, before getting into the punk scene. In late 1972, following the death of the New York Dolls' original drummer Billy Murcia, Bell was the only seriously considered alternative to the eventually chosen Jerry Nolan. "Jerry and I knew each other," he said. "When Billy died, I went down to the loft where the Dolls were auditioning… I could do different time signatures, different accents, and I basically overplayed it – put in all these drum fills that weren't necessary. And Jerry just kept the beat straight. So Jerry got it and I didn't."

In 1973, Marky joined Estus and recorded an album of the same name, produced by the Rolling Stones' first producer, Andrew Loog Oldham. Bandmates for Estus included Harry Rumpf and Tom and John Nicholas. In the mid-1970s, Bell joined Wayne County & The Backstreet Boys, Richard Hell and the Voidoids and played on their first album, Blank Generation. In May 1978, Tommy Ramone asked Bell to join the Ramones; he accepted and was renamed Marky Ramone. 

Marky was with the Ramones for the next five years. He starred in the movie Rock 'n' Roll High School, recorded the anthem, "I Wanna be Sedated", and worked with producer Phil Spector. After five albums with Dee Dee, Joey, and Johnny Ramone, Marky was asked to leave the band in February 1983 because of a drinking problem. He was replaced by Richie Ramone who was himself replaced four years later by Clem Burke of Blondie, who was asked to leave after only two shows. Marky returned clean and sober in August 1987, and played 1,700 shows and recorded ten studio albums with the band until their retirement in August 1996.

In 1996, Marky joined Dee Dee Ramone to form the Ramainz, performing Ramones songs.

In 2000, Marky joined Joey to record Joey's solo album, entitled Don't Worry About Me. Joey told talk show host Joe Franklin that Marky was his favorite drummer along with Keith Moon.

In 1997 and 1999, Marky recorded two albums with his solo band Marky Ramone and the Intruders.
In 2001, he was presented with a lifetime achievement award from MTV by U2 singer Bono.
In September 2004, Ramone served as executive producer and released a Ramones DVD entitled Ramones: Raw, which featured footage of the band while on tour all over the world along with other various rare, vintage footage. Much of the candid footage is courtesy of Marky Ramone's personal video library. Ramones: Raw is the only certified gold-selling Ramones DVD and one of only two US gold selling releases in the Ramone entire catalog, the other being the greatest hits double LP Ramones Mania. Ramones: Raw is also the highest charting release in Ramones history.

On April 22, 2008, Marky Ramone appeared on a new CD in Canada playing drums with the Canadian punk band called Teenage Head. The CD was called Teenage Head with Marky Ramone and was released in the USA on June 10, 2008.

Other work

Radio 
Since 2005, he has hosted the show Punk Rock Blitzkrieg on Sirius XM. The show was originally aired on Faction (formerly Channel 41), but has since been moved to 1st Wave (Channel 33) following the launch of Turbo on Channel 41 and the relocation of Faction to Channel 314 as an Xtra Channel. The show has been renamed to Marky Ramone's 1st Wave Blitzkrieg. In April 2018, Marky Ramone's Punk Rock Blitzkrieg launched as a 24/7 channel (Channel 712) available online only for Sirius XM subscribers. The channel features previously aired recordings of Marky Ramone's 1st Wave Blitzkrieg.

Television 
 In 1993, Ramone appeared with the Ramones in the episode "Rosebud" of The Simpsons.
 In October 2001, Ramone appeared on MTV accepting his lifetime achievement award presented by Bono of U2.
 Ramone appeared on Anthony Bourdain: No Reservations twice. On the 2007 Cleveland episode, he ate with Bourdain at the Michael Symon restaurant Lola and also toured the Rock and Roll Hall of Fame and Museum. Bourdain said Bell approved of the Ramones exhibit. On the 2010 "No Reservations Holiday Special", the two gather around a table and discuss what they want from Santa Claus (he wanted a hard-to-get Italian sports car).
 In 2017, Ramone voiced a cartoon version of himself for Cartoon Network's series Uncle Grandpa on the season 5 episode "Late Night Good Morning with Uncle Grandpa".
 In 2017, Ramone appeared on the AMC show Comic Book Men where he showed a piece of art he had created: a toy robot composed of old cell-phones.

Business 
 In 2009, Ramone teamed up with Tommy Hilfiger's Hilfiger Denim to launch his own clothing line consisting of leather jackets, jeans and T-shirts, and his own beer line.
 He has his own line of pasta sauce, "Marky Ramone's Brooklyn's Own Pasta Sauce".

Books 
In 2015, Ramone released his autobiography Punk Rock Blitzkrieg: My Life as a Ramone.

Discography 
With Dust:
 1971: Dust
 1972: Hard Attack

With Estus:
 1973: Estus

With The Voidoids:
 1976: "Another World" (single)
 1977: "Blank Generation" (single)
 1977: Blank Generation (album)

With the Ramones:
 Albums:
 1978: Road to Ruin
 1979: Rock 'n' Roll High School soundtrack
 1980: End of the Century
 1981: Pleasant Dreams
 1983: Subterranean Jungle
 1988: Ramones Mania (compilation)
 1989: Brain Drain
 1991: All the Stuff (And More!) Volume 2 (compilation)
 1991: Loco Live [EU Version] (Live)
 1992: Loco Live [US Version] (Live)
 1992: Mondo Bizarro
 1993: Acid Eaters
 1995: ¡Adios Amigos!
 1996: Greatest Hits Live (Live)
 1997: We're Outta Here! (Live)
 1999: Hey Ho! Let's Go: The Anthology (compilation)
 2002: Loud, Fast Ramones: Their Toughest Hits (compilation)
 2005: Weird Tales of the Ramones (compilation)
Singles:
 1978: "I Wanna Be Sedated"
 1978: "Needles and Pins" (1978)
 1979: "She's the One" (1979)
 1979: "Rock 'n' Roll High School" (1979)
 1980: "Baby, I Love You" (1980)
 1980: "Do You Remember Rock 'n' Roll Radio?" (1980)
 1981: "We Want the Airwaves" (1981)
 1981: "She's a Sensation" (1981)
 1983: "Psycho Therapy" (1983)
 1983: "Time Has Come Today" (1983)
 1989: "Pet Sematary" (1989)
 1989: "I Believe in Miracles" (1989)
 1992: "Poison Heart" (1992)
 1992: "Strength to Endure" (1992)
 1993: "Touring" (1993)
 1993: "Journey to the Center of the Mind" (1993)
 1993: "Substitute" (1993)
 1994: "7 and 7 Is" (1994)
 1995: "I Don't Want to Grow Up" (1995)
 1996: "R.A.M.O.N.E.S." (1996)

With Marky Ramone and the Intruders:
 1994: "Coward with the Gun" (single)
 1996: Marky Ramone & The Intruders
 1999: The Answer To Your Problems?
 2006: Start of the Century (disc 1)

With Dee Dee Ramone:
 1989: Standing in the Spotlight (album)
 1997: "I Am Seeing U.F.O's" (single)
 1997: Zonked/Ain't It Fun (album)

With The Ramainz:
 1999: Live in N.Y.C. (live album)

With Joey Ramone:
 2001: "Merry Christmas (I Don't Want to Fight Tonight)" (single)
 2002: "What a Wonderful World" (single)
 2002: Don't Worry (album)
 2002: Christmas Spirit... In My House (EP CD)

 2001: No If's, And's or But's (album)
 2002: Legends Bleed (album)

With Misfits:
 2003: Project 1950

With Osaka Popstar:
 2006: Osaka Popstar and the American Legends of Punk

Solo:
 2006: Start of the Century (disc two, live performances)

With Cherie Currie:
 2007– Cherry Bomb

With Teenage Head:
 2008: Teenage Head with Marky Ramone

With Bluesman:
 2008: "Stop Thinking" (single)

With Marky Ramone's Blitzkrieg:
 2010: "When We Were Angels" (single)
 2011: "If and When" (single)

Music video
Ramone produced, with Callicore Studio, two animated videos illustrating two songs from the Marky Ramone and the Intruders albums.
2015: "I Wanna Win the Lottery"
2016: "I Want My Beer"

Filmography 
1979: Rock 'n' Roll High School (himself)
1980: Blank Generation (member of the Voidoids)
1993: Ramones – Around the World (himself, director, producer)
1994: Space Ghost Coast to Coast (himself)
1997: We're Outta Here! (himself)
2002: The Brooklyn Boys (Tommy)
2003: End of the Century: The Story of the Ramones (himself)
2004: Ramones: Raw (himself)
2010: Lemmy (himself)
2017: Uncle Grandpa Voice Role (himself)

Awards 
Ramone's hand prints are on the Hollywood Rock Walk.
In March 2002, Ramone was inducted to the Rock and Roll Hall of Fame at New York's Waldorf Astoria as a Ramone
Marky Ramone is the only living Ramone who won the lifetime achievement award from the Grammy Awards for 2011.

Footnotes

References

External links 

1952 births
Living people
American autobiographers
American punk rock drummers
American male drummers
American people of Dutch descent
American people of French descent
American people of German descent
Musicians from Brooklyn
Marky
Richard Hell and the Voidoids members
20th-century American drummers
People from Brooklyn Heights
American twins